The Daughters of Mary, Mother of Our Savior are a congregation of Sedevacantist religious sisters founded in 1984 by Father Clarence Kelly. The motherhouse and novitiate are located in Round Top, New York, in the Catskill Mountains, with additional houses in Melville, New York, and White Bear Lake, Minnesota, where they operate schools and are involved in various forms of charity work. The congregation is led by Mother General Mary Bosco, and is associated with the Society of Saint Pius V.

History
In 1984, shortly after founding the Society of Saint Pius V, Father Clarence Kelly (now Bishop Kelly) founded the Congregation of the Daughters of Mary, Mother of Our Savior.  Fourteen acres of property in the Catskill Mountains were designated to serve as the grounds for a novitiate and motherhouse. The novitiate opened its doors in the summer of 1984, and was named after St. Joseph in the likeness of St. Teresa of Avila, who named her first foundation of the reformed Carmelites after St. Joseph. 

The congregation began with three novices and seven postulants, but throughout the years has grown steadily. As of 2019, there were over eighty members in the community.

The convent in Melville, New York, was established on August 16, 1987. The sisters there teach at Saint Pius V School and assist with the needs of the parish. There are currently twenty sisters assigned to this convent.

, St. Joseph’s Convent in White Bear Lake, Minnesota, is the organization's newest foundation. In August 2003, five sisters moved into the convent attached to St. Anne’s Church and Academy to serve there as schoolteachers.

Apostolate & Works

Though contemplation is fundamental to the religious life, few of the Daughters remain exclusively cloistered; most venture out into the community to provide services and maintain the self-sufficiency of the congregation. Many sisters teach and are secretaries at affiliated schools, some cook and take care of the houses where others teach, while still others visit and offer prayer to the residents of local nursing homes. At the Motherhouse, there are sisters who sew habits, make vestments, hosts, and rosaries, do book-binding and other necessary office work.

Daughters of Mary v. LaSalle
In August 2008, the Daughters of Mary Mother of Our Savior and St Joseph’s Chapel said that art dealer Mark Zaplin, and Mark LaSalle, a New York State art appraiser, colluded to defraud them of $1.7 million they believe could have been obtained from selling Notre Dame des Anges, an 1889 artwork by William-Adolphe Bouguereau that depicts Mary standing in the clouds with the Christ Child surrounded by angels.

In the complaint filed in the New York Supreme Court that year, the Daughters, represented by New York City attorney Bruce Goldstone, said that LaSalle and Zaplin "intentionally, deliberately, wantedly, maliciously [and] with evil motive … perpetrated fraud" against the congregation.

In May, 2006, LaSalle sent a proposed purchase agreement to congregation founder Bishop Clarence Kelly. The $450,000 check was also sent to Bishop Kelly around this time. In response, Bishop Kelly explained that he had consulted an attorney and proposed several revisions to the terms of the agreement without adjusting the purchase price. The Daughters consulted a parishioner, Mr. Erdelyi, and independently researched the value of Bouguereau paintings on the internet prior to the sale. LaSalle forwarded a revised agreement on June 20, 2006, which included Bishop Kelly's revision that a transfer would not occur until the $450,000 check was deposited. Bishop Kelly deposited the check in early August, 2006.

In his deposition, Zaplin said that he spent an additional $45,000 to apply a lining to the back of the painting and for a frame. After arranging to have the painting displayed at the Dallas Museum of Fine Arts (although the painting remained in New York), Zaplin sold the painting in 2007 for $2.15 million through a Texas art dealer. After expenses, the net profit was distributed as follows: $150,000 to Paul Dumont, a third-party defendant, with LaSalle and Zaplin each receiving $750,000. Zaplin said that the distribution was only determined after the Texas sale.

Goldstone said that LaSalle’s "lowball" appraisal, in concert with Zaplin’s “straw purchase,” constituted negligent misrepresentation, breach of contract, express or implied warranty, fraud, breach of fiduciary duty, deceptive business practices and violation of the penal law regarding stealing property. The requested wages for those causes of action, amounted to $1.75 million, plus $50 million in punitive damages.

The case went to jury trial in December 2011. Before Justice Michael C. Lynch of the Albany County Supreme Court on January 6, 2012, closing arguments were presented to the jury after a brief hiatus during the New Year’s holiday. The case went to the jury on Monday, January 9, and by Monday afternoon the verdict came back that the two men on trial for "scamming" the Daughters of Mary, Mark Zaplin and Mark LaSalle, were found not guilty. In addition to dismissing the complaint against Zaplin and LaSalle in its entirety, the jury awarded Mark LaSalle, compensatory and punitive damages against Kelly and Dumont.

See also
 Traditional Catholicism
 List of Catholic religious institutes
 Tridentine Mass

References

External links
 Daughters of Mary Official Website
 Goldman, Ari L., "A Fight Over an Ex-Nun's Mind and Soul", The New York Times, August 11, 1988

Traditionalist Catholic nuns and religious sisters
Christian religious orders established in the 20th century
Christian organizations established in 1984
Catholic dissident organizations